Zarrin Jub (also Romanized as Zarrīn Jūb; also known as Zarrīn Chūb, Zarrīn-e Jonūbī, Zarrin Janūbi, and Zarrīn Jū) is a village in Khosrowabad Rural District, Chang Almas District, Bijar County, Kurdistan Province, Iran. At the 2006 census, its population was 32, in 5 families. The village is populated by Kurds.

References 

Towns and villages in Bijar County
Kurdish settlements in Kurdistan Province